The Syriac Catholic Patriarchal Exarchate of Jerusalem (informally Jerusalem of the Syriacs) is a Patriarchal exarchate (missionary Eastern Catholic pre-diocesan jurisdiction) of the Syriac Catholic Church (Antiochian Rite in Syriac language and Arameic) for Palestine and Jordan.

It is directly dependent on the Syriac Catholic Patriarch of Antioch (with see in Beirut), but not part of his or any other ecclesiastical province, and depends in Rome on the Congregation for the Oriental Churches.

Its cathedral episcopal see is the Church of Saint Thomas in Jerusalem.

History 
Established in 1991 as Patriarchal Exarchate of Jerusalem (Palestine and Jordan), on territory (Palestine and (Trans)Jordan) previously without proper Ordinary of the particular church sui iuris, which was governed as Patriarchal Vicariate of Jerusalem of the Syriacs.

Ordinaries 
All West Syriac Rite.

Patriarchal Exarchs of Jerusalem (Palestine and Jordan)
 Father Pierre Jaroûë (? – 1820.02.25), later Patriarch of Antioch of the Syriacs (Lebanon) as Ignatius Peter VII Jarweh ([1820.02.25] 1828.01.28 – death 1851.10.16)
 Grégoire Pierre Abdel-Ahad (1991 – 2000), Titular Bishop of Batnæ of the Syriacs (1996.06.29 – 2001.02.16); previously Patriarchal Vicar of Jerusalem (Palestine and Jordan) of the Syriacs (Palestine) (1978 – 1991); later Patriarch of Antioch of the Syriacs (Lebanon) ([2001.02.16] 2001.02.24 – retired 2008.01.25) as Ignace Pierre VIII Abdel-Ahad, President of Synod of the Syriac Catholic Church (2001.02.24 – 2008.01.25)
 Grégoire Pierre Melki (25 February 2002 – 20 November 2019), Titular Bishop of Batnæ of the Syriacs (2002.02.25 – present)
  (28 March 2020 – present)

References

External links 
 GCatholic with incumbent bio links
 Catholic-hierarchy.org

Jerusalem
Jerusalem
Eastern Catholicism in Israel
Eastern Catholicism in Jordan